Timeless: Live in Concert is a live album released by Barbra Streisand on September 19, 2000 (see 2000 in music).  It was her fifth live album and was released on Columbia Records (catalog no. 63778). The album was issued a week before what were said to be her final concerts in September 2000 and would reach platinum certification.

Content
Timeless is a double album which includes moments from Streisand's New Year's Eve, 1999 and New Year's Day, 2000 shows at the MGM Grand Garden Arena on the Las Vegas Strip, which were part of her Timeless concert tour. The release is set up like a play in two acts and even has a two-minute entr'acte featuring conductor, Marvin Hamlisch, who is also present throughout the performance.  It opens with a dramatization of her first, amateur recording session, in which Lauren Frost plays a part described in the credits as "Young Girl" though Streisand later refers to her as "my little-girl self" and "mini me". The rest of Act One traces Streisand's career from her club days to Broadway and her movie performances.

Act two opens with several of Barbra's duets. This section is followed by dialogue and songs both reminiscent and optimistic thanks to the backdrop of the New Year's holiday.  As the midnight hour approaches, Barbra is joined on stage by husband, James Brolin. Much of the dialogue takes place as small scenes or skits about time and timelessness.  The CD version includes songs that span Streisand's career up to that time, such as "Cry Me a River" and "Happy Days Are Here Again", from her debut album, and "At the Same Time" from her 1997 album Higher Ground.

The 24-page CD insert includes photographs, portraits and concert shots as well as an account of the dress rehearsal written by producer, Jay Landers.  The 2-CD set includes over two hours of performance divided into 37 tracks.  The album debuted at No. 21 on the Billboard 200 and remained on the chart for fifteen consecutive weeks. On the Top Internet Albums chart, Timeless peaked at No. 2. On October 20, 2000, the album received gold and platinum certification from the RIAA. According to Nielsen Soundscan, the albums sold over 477,000 copies as of 2007.

Barnes & Noble offered a bonus in their sale of the CD package:  a CD single "Come Rain Or Come Shine" recorded live during one of Barbra's Australian performances.

Track listing

Disc one – Act one
"Opening/You'll Never Know" (with Lauren Frost, Alec Ledd, and Randee Heller) (Harry Warren, Mack Gordon) – 2:31
"Something's Coming" (with Lauren Frost) (Leonard Bernstein, Stephen Sondheim) – 3:41
"The Way We Were" (Marvin Hamlisch, Alan Bergman, Marilyn Bergman) – 4:18
"Shirley MacLaine Y1K" (dialogue) – 4:41
"Cry Me a River" (Arthur Hamilton) – 3:14
"Lover, Come Back To Me" (Oscar Hammerstein II, Sigmund Romberg) – 2:54
"A Sleepin' Bee" (Harold Arlen, Truman Capote) – 3:43
"Miss Marmelstein" (Harold Rome) – 2:27
"I'm the Greatest Star/Second Hand Rose/Don't Rain on My Parade" (Jule Styne, Bob Merrill / Grant Clarke, J.F. Hanly / Styne, Merrill) – 5:21
"Something Wonderful/Being Alive" (Rodgers and Hammerstein / Sondheim) – 4:35
"As Time Goes By"/"Speak Low" (Herman Hupfeld / Kurt Weill, Ogden Nash) – 2:10
"Alfie" (Burt Bacharach, Hal David) – 4:02
"Evergreen" (Streisand, Paul Williams) – 4:04
"Dialogue" (Father, Part #1) – 1:18
"Papa, Can You Hear Me?/You'll Never Know" (with Lauren Frost) (Michel Legrand, A. Bergman, M. Bergman / Warren, Gordon) – 3:20
"A Piece of Sky" (with Lauren Frost) (Legrand, A. Bergman, M. Bergman) – 3:13

Disc two – Act two
"Entr'acte" (Hamlisch) – 2:21
"Putting It Together" (Sondheim) – 3:35
"On A Clear Day (You Can See Forever)" (Alan Jay Lerner, Burton Lane) – 2:27
"Send in the Clowns" (Sondheim) – 3:06
"Happy Days Are Here Again/Get Happy" (with Judy Garland)/"Guilty" (with Barry Gibb)/"I Finally Found Someone" (with Bryan Adams)/"Tell Him" (with Celine Dion)/"You Don't Bring Me Flowers" (with Neil Diamond)" (Milton Ager, Jack Yellen / Arlen, Ted Koehler / B. Gibb, Maurice Gibb, Robin Gibb / Adams, Hamlisch, Robert Lange / Linda Thompson, Walter Afanasieff, David Foster / Diamond, A. Bergman, M. Bergman) – 2:07
"Sing" (with Jason Gould)/"I've Got a Crush on You" (with Frank Sinatra) (Joe Raposo / George Gershwin, Ira Gershwin) – 3:22
"Technology" (Dialogue) – 2:03
"The Clicker Blues" (Hamlisch, A. Bergman, M. Bergman) – 0:58
"Simple Pleasures" (Hamlisch, A. Bergman, M. Bergman) – 3:02
"The Main Event/Fight" (Paul Jabara, Bruce Roberts / Jabara, Bob Esty) – 4:07
"Dialogue" (Father, Part #2) – 1:35
"I've Dreamed of You" (Rolf Løvland, Ann Hampton Callaway) – 3:24
"At the Same Time" (Callaway) – 4:53
"Auld Lang Syne (Ballad)" (adapted by Robert Burns) – 1:49
"Dialogue" (Barbra and Brother Time) – 0:51
"People" (Styne, Merrill) – 3:46
"New Year's Eve/Auld Lang Syne" (Celebration) – 6:00
"Everytime You Hear Auld Lang Syne" (Barbra/Audience) (Hamlisch, A. Bergman, M. Bergman) – 4:22
"Happy Days Are Here Again" (Ager, Yellen) – 3:33
"Don't Like Goodbyes" (Arlen, Capote) – 1:42
"I Believe/Somewhere" (with Lauren Frost) (Ervin Drake, Irvin Graham, Jimmy Shirl, Al Stillman / Bernstein, Sondheim) – 8:42

Personnel

NOTE: Some performers do not appear in person.
Bryan Adams – vocals
Robert L. Adcock – celli
Louis Armstrong – trumpet
Steve Becknell – french horn
Douglas Besterman – arranger
Chris Bishop – engineer
Peggie Blu – backing vocals
Chris Boardman – arranger
Ralph Burns – arranger, adaptation
Jorge Calandrelli – arranger
Darius Campo – violin
Chris Carlton – engineer
Jon Clarke – woodwind
John Clayton – arranger
Don Costa – arranger
Joe Covello – photography
Debbie Datz-Pyle – contractor
Mario de Leon – violin
Neil Diamond – vocals
Celine Dion – vocals
Chuck Domanico – bass
Bruce Dukov – violin
Sam Emerson – photography
Martin Erlichman – executive producer
Bob Esty – arranger, conductor
David Ewart – violin
Peter Fletcher – product manager
David Foster – arranger
Bruce Fowler – trombone
Ian Freebairn-Smith – arranger
Lauren Frost – vocals
Matt Funes – viola
Judy Garland – vocals
Barry Gibb – vocals
Phil Gitomer – technical manager
Savion Glover – actor
Mark Graham – librarian
Gary Grant – trumpet
Dan Greco – percussion
Henry Grossman – photography
Marvin Hamlisch – arranger, director
Jack Hayes – arranger
Gwen Heller – violin

Randee Heller – vocals
David Hewitt - recording engineer
 Remote Recording's Silver Truck
Ryan Hewitt – assistant engineer
Jerry Hey – trumpet
Dan Higgins – woodwind
Jim Hoffman – librarian
Rupert Holmes – arranger
Carrie Holzman-Little – viola
Paul Jabara – arranger
Bruce Jackson – sound design
Ron Jannelli – woodwind
Alan Kaplan – trombone
Eddie Karam – arranger
Suzie Katayama – celli
Steve Khan – narrator
Jay Landers – executive producer
Alec Ledd – vocals
Annie Leibovitz – photography
Brian Leonard – violin
Warren Leuning – trumpet
Gayle Levant – harp
Dane Little – celli
Charles Loper – trombone
Jeremy Lubbock – arranger
Stephen Marcussen – mastering
Nick Marshall – mixing
Peter Matz – arranger, producer
Kevin Mazur – photography
Ed Meares – bass
Don Mischer – producer
Suzette Moriarty – French horn
Horia Moroaica – violin
Ralph Morrison – concert master
Peter Morse – lighting design, lighting director
Dan Newfeld – viola
Robin Olson – violin
Kenny Ortega – writer, assistant director
Marty Paich – arranger
Dean Parks – guitar
Joel Peskin – woodwind
Barbara Porter – violin
Sid Ramin – arranger
Tom Ranier – keyboards
Gabrielle Raumberger – art direction, design
Dave Reitzas – mixing

Nelson Riddle – arranger
Bruce Roberts – arranger
Gil Romero – violin
William James Ross – arranger
Randee Saint Nicholas – photography
Mark Sazer – violin
Walter Scharf – arranger
Harry Shirinian – viola
John Simpson – engineer
Frank Sinatra – vocals
Kim Skalecki – assistant
Lew Soloff – trumpet
Michael Starobin – arranger
Barbra Streisand – director, vocals, producer, writer
Neil Stubenhaus – electric bass
Shari Sutcliffe – project coordinator
Karen Swenson – consultant, photo research
Sydney Philharmonia Choirs - backing choir
Phil Teele – trombone
Alberto Tolot – photography
Bob Tricarico – woodwind
Charles Valentino – actor
Fred Vogler – engineer
Jürgen Vollmer – photography
Randy Waldman – arranger, keyboards
Brad Warnaar – French horn
Phil Yao – French horn
Ken Yerke – violin
Firooz Zahedi – photography, cover photo
Patty Zimmitti – contractor
Robert Zimmitti – percussion
Torrie Zito – arranger

Charts

Certifications and sales

!colspan=3|Album
|-

!colspan=3|Video
|-

References

Works cited

Columbia Records live albums
2000 live albums
Barbra Streisand live albums
Albums recorded at the MGM Grand Las Vegas